Durium was a short-lived record label in the United Kingdom run by Durium Products (GB) Ltd in the 1930s.
 
Its presses were located in Slough, near London.  Its products and marketing were derived from the American record company Durium Products, Inc., producer of the Hit of the Week record label.  Durium Products sold its single-sided paper gramophone records from around 1930 to 1933 whereas the UK firm operated only from 1932 to 1933. Their records were also exported to other European countries, including Sweden and Denmark (see illustration).

Using the fast-setting new material Durium, the label's production costs were much lower than for the shellac discs of the time.  Hit of the Week discs sold for just one shilling and enjoyed great popularity.

Bibliography
 Russell, Tony. (2004). Country Music Records: A Discography, 1921-1942. New York, NY: Oxford University Press, (Durium entry, page 31)

See also
 Hit of the Week Records
 List of record labels
 Durium Records

British record labels
Record labels established in 1930
Record labels disestablished in 1933
Italian record labels
Record labels established in 1935
Record labels disestablished in 1989
Jazz record labels